Al-Hillah  is a district in Babil Governorate, Iraq.  It is centred on the city  of Al Hillah.

Cities
 Al Hillah
 Al Sahlan

Districts of Babil Governorate